is a Japanese four-panel manga series written and illustrated by Uoyama. It was serialized online via Niconico Seiga and Pixiv from June 2018 to February 2022, with its chapters collected into eight tankōbon volumes. A television drama adaptation aired from October to December 2021.

Media

Manga
Written and illustrated by Uoyama, Love's in Sight! began serialization on Niconico Seiga and Pixiv on June 24, 2018. It also began publication on the Manga Hack website in August 2018. The series ended serialization on February 26, 2022. Media Factory compiled the chapters into eight tankōbon volumes, published from January 2019 to May 2022.

In June 2022, Viz Media announced that it will publish the series in English starting in Q2 2023.

Volume list

Drama
A television drama adaptation was announced in July 2021, starring Hana Sugisaki. Titled , the series is directed by Hidemi Uchida and Shunsuke Kariyama, based on a screenplay by Yūko Matsuda. Masahiro Tokuda composed the music, while Masahiro Mori, Reina Oda, and Kaori Suzuki served as the series' producers. It aired on NTV from October 6 to December 15, 2021.

A three-episode spin-off drama, titled , was released on Hulu from November 10 to December 8, 2021.

Reception
In 2019, Love's in Sight! ranked 14th at the fifth Next Manga Awards in the web manga category. In 2022, the series was nominated at the 46th Kodansha Manga Awards in the general category.

References

2021 Japanese television series debuts
2021 Japanese television series endings
Japanese webcomics
Literature about blind people
Media Factory manga
Nippon TV dramas
Romantic comedy anime and manga
Shōjo manga
Television shows about blind people
Viz Media manga
Webcomics in print
Yonkoma